Peter Somogyi  is the former Director of the Medical Research Council Anatomical Neuropharmacology Unit at the University Department of Pharmacology, University of Oxford, England.

Amongst many scientific honours he was elected as a fellow of the Royal Society in 2000, and awarded the first (together with hungarian co-winners Gyorgy Buzsaki and Tamás Freund) Grete Lundbeck European Brain Research Foundation Brain Prize in 2011.

References

Living people
Hungarian neuroscientists
Fellows of the Royal Society
1950 births